Visby/Roma HK is a Swedish hockey club located in Visby on Gotland. The club currently plays in group East of Hockeyettan, the third tier of Swedish ice hockey, as of the 2014–15 season. The club plays its home games in Visby ishall, which has a capacity of 2000 spectators.

References

External links 
Official website
Club profile on Eliteprospects.com

Ice hockey teams in Sweden
Ice hockey teams in Gotland County